Château de Mauriac may refer to:

Château de Mauriac (Douzillac)
Château de Mauriac (Senouillac)